The FCW Florida Heavyweight Championship was a professional wrestling heavyweight championship owned and promoted by Florida Championship Wrestling (FCW), a former developmental territory of WWE. It is contested for in their heavyweight division. The championship was created and debuted on February 15, 2008 at a FCW house show.

The first champion was Jake Hager who won a 23-man battle royal by defeating Ted DiBiase Jr. to become the first champion. On March 22, 2008, Hager defeated FCW Southern Heavyweight Champion Heath Miller to unify the two championships and retire the FCW Southern Heavyweight Championship. Bo Rotundo/Dallas holds the record for the most reigns with three reigns. Leo Kruger, Rick Victor and Bo Rotundo all hold the record for shortest reign, because all three have individually won and lost the title on the same day. Jake Hager holds the record for the longest reign (as an individual) with 216 days. In August 2012, the championship was retired when FCW was closed down and WWE created NXT as the new farm territory and replaced with the NXT Championship. The final champion was Richie Steamboat, who defeated Rick Victor to win the title.

Reigns

Reigns

Combined reigns

References

State professional wrestling championships
Heavyweight Championship